The Herero people of Namibia are ruled by traditional leaders, the highest office is that of the Paramount Chief. During part of the South African apartheid administration in South West Africa, when Hereroland was a bantustan (designated area for Herero settlement), they additionally had a political representative to the South African Administration, which was decoupled from chieftaincy in 1980. Fast forward a few years after Independence in 1990, there are many traditional authorities in terms of Traditional Authorities Act, 1995 (Act No. 25 of 2000 as amended). Since the implementation of the Traditional Authorities Act in 1995, the independent government of the Republic of Namibia sought to recognize individual royal houses within the Ovaherero communities as stand-alone traditional authorities and denied recognition the overarching Ovaherero Traditional Authority (OTA) that has been in existence since 1863. Paramount Chief Riruako fought for recognition and the Authority was then recognized in 2008 and himself gazetted as head of the traditional community at the beginning of 2009. He and others instituted a legal claim against three German companies.  When Riruako passed on June 2nd, 2014, many groups saw the opportunity to seize the opportunity to control the heart and soul of the Ovaherero Traditional Authority. The Chiefs Council appointed Tumbee Tjombe as Acting Paramount Chief and when he died a month later, a senior councilor Vipuira Kapuuo and Chairperson was appointed as Acting Paramount Chief as per customary law. Adv Vekuii Rukoro was then elected as the new paramount chief on 22nd September 2014, with a clear mission to fight for the reparation of Ovaherero and Nama peoples whose ancestors were exterminated by the Imperial German government during the period of 1904 to 1908. Adv Rukoro with his Nama counterpart, Gaob David Frederick and later on Gaob Johannes Isaak, demanded direct participations in the negotiations for reparation with the German Government, but the Namibian and German governments denied them of their rights to self-representation. In 2017 the Ovaherero and Nama leaders filed a class action lawsuit in the Southern Court of New York, a case which ended up in the Supreme Court of the United States of America. Adv Rukoro passed on, on 18th June 2021, due to Covid-19 complications, and subsequently the one faction of the Ovaherero Chiefs Council under Chief Tjiundje unanimously appointed Professor Dr Mutjinde Katjiua as his successor. Prof Katjiua had served as Rukoro's right hand in his capacity of the OTA Secretary-General, In April 2022, Professor Dr Mutjinde Katjiua took Chief Kapuuo to court on an urgent basis as per statutory law, but he could not prove in court that he was indeed the Paramount Chief. On the 12th of April 2022, Judge Oosthuizen J established that Dr. Mutjinde Katjiua lacks the locus standi to have brought the application under the Ovaherero Traditional Authority - Case number: HC-MD-CIV-MOT-GEN-2022/00126 However, the Chairperson of the Chiefs Council and Senate, Senior Councilor Vipuira Kapuuo, who claimed the position of automatic Acting Paramount Chief as per customary law filed a lawsuit seeking to ascertain his role and powers under customary law, tradition and protocols. The case is before court (current Feb/March 2023), In the meantime Kapuuo convened an elective Senate to elect a new paramount chief, and at this senate meeting, Dr. Hoze Riruako emerged victorious as the new Paramount Chief of the great Ovaherero Nation. Dr. Riruako is a nephew of Chief Hosea Kutako and Chief Dr Kuaima Riruako.  As it stands there are two Paramount Chiefs in the Ovaherero Traditional Authority

Paramount Chiefs of the Herero
The genealogy of the Paramount Chiefs of the Herero is:

 The position is vacant and in dispute, and so far, no formal gazetting has been done by the government of the Republic of Namibia through the Ministry of Urban and Rural Development on the paramount chief of the Ovaherero Traditional Authority.  Potential candidates are Dr. Hoze Riruako and Dr. Mutjinde Katjiua. 
 On the 12th of April 2022, Judge Oosthuizen J established that Dr. Mutjinde Katjiua lacks the locus standi to have brought the application under the Ovaherero Traditional Authority - Case number: HC-MD-CIV-MOT-GEN-2022/00126 

 2022/23 - Chairperson of the Chiefs Council has always been the acting Paramount Chief, being the most senior of the two senior headmen. in terms of Ovaherero customary law and protocols, the Chairman of the Chief's Council becomes the acting Paramount Chief, whenever the Paramount Chief passes away or is otherwise infirm, and until a successor Paramount Chief is democratically elected by the representatives of all the clans. After passing on of Paramount Chief Advocate Vekuii Rukoro. The Chairperson called on a Chiefs Council meeting at Okandjira on April 7, 2022, and after the tombstone unveiling of the late Paramount Chief, the Chairperson called on another Chiefs Council meeting at Ozombuzovindimba, Otjinene, on September 30, 2022, and three candidates for the position of Ovaherero Paramount Chief were officially endorsed by the OTA Chiefs Council.  The Senate meeting was held on the 2 - 4 February 2023 in Otjimbingwe. Senate elected Dr. Hoze Riruako as Paramount Chief of the Ovaherero under the Ovaherero Traditional Authority.

 Vekuii Rukoro (2014-2021) In June 2014, when Paramount Chief Kuaima Riruako passed away, the chairman of the Chiefs Council, Tumbee Tjombe, who was deputized by Vipuira Kapuuo, became the acting Paramount Chief. In July of the same year, the acting Paramount Chief Tumbee Tjombe passed away, and thus his deputy, Vipuira Kapuuo became the chairperson of the Chiefs Council and ipso facto the acting Paramount Chief. Acting Paramount Chief Vipuira Kapuuo, as chairperson of the Chiefs Council, convened a Senate meeting in October 2014 at the Ehungiro village. At this meeting, elections were held and Advocate Vekuii Rukoro emerged amongst several candidates 
 Kuaima Riruako (1978–2014)  March 1978, after the assassination of Paramount Chief Clemence Kapuuo, the chairperson of the Chiefs' Council, Senior Headman Gerson Hoveka became the acting Paramount Chief until a Senate meeting was convene in the same year where Kuaima Riruako was elected, amongst several candidates, as the substantive Paramount Chief.
 Clemens Kapuuo (1970–1978) 1970 - Due to the advanced age of Paramount Chief Hosea Kutako, in 1960 Clemence Kapuuo, who was the Secretary of the Chiefs Council, was appointed as Deputy Paramount Chief. In 1970, following the passing away of Paramount Chief Hosea Kutako, he was then appointed as the substantive Paramount Chief.
 Hosea Kutako (1917–1970) 1920 - Following the Herero-German War from 1904 to 1908, Paramount Chief Samuel Maharero fled to Bechuanaland (now Botswana). This created a leadership vacuum amongst the Ovaherero, more so when the Ovaherero were incarcerated into the concentration camps. When the Ovaherero were released from the concentration camps in 1915, an election was held among the clan leaders and their councillors to choose between these two candidates, namely Hosea Kutako and Kaevaka Kamaheke for the position of Acting Paramount Chief. Hosea Kutako emerged victorious, and was later confirmed as  Paramount Chief in 1920.Hosea Kutako
 Samuel Maharero (1890–1917) 1892 - When Paramount Chief Maharero passed away in 1890, his son Samuel Maharero connived with the incoming German colonial governor Theodor Leutwein  to entrench himself in the position of Paramount Chief in 1892.
 Maharero ka Tjamuaha (1861–1890) 1863 - Historically the Herero community is made up of various clans, each with their own traditional leaders. The wars against the Namas and Germans made it necessary for all the clans to unite, as a group, in order to elect one military leader who would lead all the clans in the wars against the Namas and the Germans. That is how, on 15 June 1863 at Otjizingue (now Otjimbingwe), Maharero was elected as the commander-in-chief ("muniovita") of all the Herero clans. The various clans were headed by their own chiefs and traditional councilors, who represented them and reported to the commander-in-chief. Maharero was elected, at a meeting held at Otjizingue (Otjimbingwe) during 1867, by the clans as the very first Paramount Chief ("muniouje” and “ombara otjitambi")

Political chief representatives of Hereroland and Herero tribe parliamentarians
Hereroland was declared in 1968, along with other bantustans in South West Africa. Self–governance of Hereroland was granted on 26 Jul 1970, which lasted until May 1989. The Chair of the Executive Committee of Hereroland was occupied by:
 Hosea Kutako (2 October 1968 to July 1970)
 Clemens Kapuuo (July 1970 to 27 March 1978)
 Kuaima Riruako (7 June 1978 to 5 December 1980)
 Thimoteus Tjamuaha (5 December 1980 to September 1984)
 Erastus Tjejamba (August 1987 to October 1987 and October 1987 to February 1988)
 Gottlob Mbaukua (September 1984 to August 1987 and February 1988 to May 1989)
 McHenry Venaani (9 September 2013 - present) Leader of the official opposition in parliament , member of the Namibian Parliament (Nam), and He is a member of the Pan-African Parliament (AU).

Herero and Mbanderu Traditional Authorities - 
Ovaherero Traditional Authority
Zeraeua Royal Traditional Authority
Hoveka Royal Traditional Authority
Kambazembi Royal Traditional Authority
Maharero Royal Traditional Authority
Mureti Royal Traditional Authority
Ovambanderu Traditional Authority
Kapika Traditional Authority
Kakurukouje Traditional Authority
Otjikaoko Royal House Traditional Authority
Vita Royal House Traditional Authority
Ovambanderu Traditional Council
Ombandi Royal House
Bantustans in South West Africa

References

Apartheid in South West Africa
Bantustans in South West Africa